Mohammad Babar Azam (Urdu, ; born 15 October 1994), is a Pakistani international cricketer and captain of the Pakistan national cricket team in all formats. Regarded as one of the finest batters in contemporary world cricket, he is the only cricketer in the world to be in the top five rankings across all formats. He is ranked as the number one batter in ODIs and number three in Tests and T20Is. A right-handed top-order batter, he plays for and captains Peshawar Zalmi in the PSL and Central Punjab in domestic cricket of Pakistan. With 40 wins, he is one of the most successful T20I captains of all time.

Early life 

Babar Azam was born on 15 October 1994 into a Punjabi Muslim family. He was born in the Walled City and recalls the memories of "playing cricket and roaming around like a free bird in those streets." His older cousins Kamran and Umar Akmal were the reason he was attracted to cricket, and their stories inspired him to take up cricket as his profession. He had been a ball boy at Gaddafi Stadium before joining a cricket academy and starting his domestic cricket career there. He was present during the home series Pakistan played between 2006 and 2008. 

He sought guidance from Rana Sadiq, his first coach, who taught him the fundamentals of batting. Later, he went on to be a part of the Pakistan U-19 setup.

International career

Early career 
In May 2015, Babar was included in the Pakistani ODI squad for home series against Zimbabwe. He made his ODI debut in the third ODI on 31 May and scored an impressive fifty scoring 54 runs off 60 balls. His impressive debut earned him a place in both Test and ODI squads selected for an away series against  Sri Lanka. He was not selected to play in the Test series. During the ODI series, he only scored 37 runs in the two matches that he played. Babar was included in the squad for the away ODI series against Zimbabwe in September 2015.

He was retained in the ODI squad for the home series against England. In the first ODI of the four match series he scored 62 not out with a strike rate of 100 which helped Pakistan win the match. He had scores of  4, 22 and 51 in next three matches respectively. He finished the series with 139 runs at an average of 46.33.

In January 2016, Pakistan toured New Zealand. In the first ODI match, Babar scored 62 runs off 76 balls. Pakistan lost the match by 70 runs. He was the leading run scorer in the ODI series with 145 runs in 2 innings at an average of 72.50.

In the five-match ODI series against England in July, he batted in five games and only scored 122 runs. He made his Twenty20 International debut for Pakistan against England on 7 September. He scored an unbeaten 15 runs off 11 balls. Pakistan won the match and series.

Besides the England series, Pakistan played two match ODI series against Ireland. In the first ODI of the series, Pakistan beat Ireland by 255 runs and created record of their biggest win in terms of runs in an ODI.  Babar contributed in his side's victory by scoring 29 runs. With the second and final ODI abandoned due to rain, Pakistan won the series 1–0.

Rise in shorter formats and breaking records 

Babar Azam was selected in the home series against the West Indies in 2016. In the first match of the ODI series he scored his maiden international century, scoring 120 off 131 balls and winning his first man of the match award. In the second ODI, he scored another century, this time scoring 123 off 126 balls, and helping Pakistan to put up a total of more than 330. In the third and final ODI of the series Azam ended up scoring a third consecutive century (117 from 106). He also broke the record for scoring the most runs (360) in a three match ODI series. He became the only batsman to score 350+ runs in a three match ODI series.

He made his Test debut for Pakistan against the West Indies in Dubai on 13 October 2016 and scored 69 runs in his first innings. He was the first player to score a fifty on his Test debut through a day/night Test.

On 19 January 2017, in the third ODI against Australia, Azam became then joint-fastest player to score 1,000 runs in ODIs and then fastest for Pakistan in his 21st innings before his national record and world record was eclipsed by his compatriot Fakhar Zaman. He scored a century in the fifth ODI, which was only the second century ever scored by a Pakistani batsman in Australia after Zaheer Abbas in 1981. He also entered the top 10 batsmen's ranking in ODIs for the first time ever.

Sarfaraz Ahmed replaced Azhar Ali as Pakistan's ODI team captain against the West Indies after Azhar Ali stepped down from the captaincy after a humiliating defeat against Australia in ODI series. He scored an unbeaten 125 in the 2nd ODI of the three–match ODI series at Providence Stadium, Guyana. Azam along with Imad Wasim put on an unbeaten 99 runs partnership which helped Pakistan to a total of 282. Meanwhile, Azam also broke the record of scoring the most runs after the first 25 ODI innings in this match.

In the Champions Trophy 2017, Azam scored 46 off 52 balls in the final match against India. After a successful Champions trophy tour, ICC sent the World XI team in Pakistan where they played three T20I matches. Azam was the top runs-getter in the series, scoring 179. In the first T20I played at Gaddafi Stadium, Lahore, he scored 86 playing only 52 balls, and won his first Man of the match award in T20Is, helping Pakistan win the match by 20 runs.
 He had scores of 45 and 48 in the next two fixtures.

In September 2017, he had a poor Test series against Sri Lanka, where he managed to score only 39 runs across 2 Test matches. In the second ODI he became the fastest batsman to score 7th ODI century in ODIs and the first batsman in ODI history to score five consecutive centuries in one country. He had scores of 30 and 69 (not out) in next two innings while chasing.

He was the leading runs-scorer for Pakistan in 2016 in ODIs and T20Is with 872 and 352 runs respectively. At the 2017 PCB awards, he was awarded Pakistan's ODI Player of the year. He was also listed in 2017's ICC World ODI XI for the first time ever.

Pakistan's first assignment in 2018 was tour to New Zealand. Babar was an automatic selection in the ODI team. However he could score only 0, 10, 8, 3, 10 across 5 innings, scoring only 31 runs at an average of 6.2 as Pakistan were whitewashed 5–0, his worst series until date. But performed well in the T20I series and contributed in team's winning the series 2–1. Babar was the leading run scorer with 109 runs. He had scores of 41, 50* and 18 in these T20Is. He became the no.1 T20I batsmen, the second to reach the feat after Misbah-ul-Haq, but soon slipped to no. 3 position. He regained no. 1 spot in the rankings after a successful series  against West Indies, who were touring Pakistan after thirteen years. His best performance came in the second T20I where he scored an unbeaten 97 runs which won him Man of the match award. He finished the series as leading run-getter with  165 runs at an average of 82.50 and a strike rare of 148.64, and won the man of the series. Pakistan won the series 3–0.Babar, Fakhar lead Pakistan to 3–0.

During a Test match against England in May 2018, Azam was struck on the arm without padding by a bouncer from Ben Stokes, when he was batting on 68. After an X-ray examination, it was confirmed that Azam had a fracture in his left wrist with a broken forearm. After fully recovering from his injury, he made his return to the side against Zimbabwe in July for a five-match ODI series. He performed well and managed to score 184 runs at an average of 184 in 4 innings including 76 balls 106 runs in the final odi of the series.

In September 2018, he was selected for 2018 Asia Cup held in United Arab Emirates (UAE). Playing his first Asia Cup, he didn't have a good time of it, only managing to score 156 runs at an average of 31.20 in 5 matches. In November 2018, in the second Test against New Zealand, Azam scored his first century in Test cricket.

2019 Cricket World Cup 
In April 2019, he was named in Pakistan's squad for the 2019 Cricket World Cup. The International Cricket Council (ICC) named him as one of the five exciting talents making their Cricket World Cup debut. In May 2019, he was also signed by Somerset as their overseas player for the 2019 t20 Blast.

Just before the World Cup, Pakistan played against England in one-off T20I and 5-match ODI series to prepare for the tournament. In the T20I fixture he scored 65 from 42 balls before getting run-out. In the 5-match ODI series, he ended up as the joint leading runs-scorer, scoring 277 runs including a century and two half-centuries, going into the World Cup with runs under his belt. On 26 June 2019, in the match against New Zealand, Azam became the fastest batsman for Pakistan, in terms of innings, to score 3,000 runs in ODIs (68). In the same match, he also scored his 10th century in ODIs, finishing 101 not out, with Pakistan winning by 6 wickets. With this century, he also became the first middle-order batsman from Pakistan to hit a century in a World Cup match after 32 years. A week later, in the match against Bangladesh, Babar broke Javed Miandad's record of the most runs by a Pakistani batsman in a single edition of the World Cup, scoring 474 runs in 8 innings.

Test performances and leadership roles
In September 2019, before the home series against Sri Lanka, he was named as the vice-captain of Pakistan cricket team in both ODIs and T20Is, on the back of his consistent performances in these formats. After the first ODI was washed out, Pakistan managed to win both of the remaining matches to clinch the series 2–0. He scored his 11th ton in the second ODI and became the fastest Pakistani player to reach 1,000 ODI runs in terms of innings in a calendar year beating the previous record of Javed Miandad. In October 2019, he was named captain of the Pakistan cricket team in T20Is, ahead of the Australia series.

In the first Test of the series, he scored his second Test century, against a strong bowling line up. He missed out on his second consecutive century when he was dismissed on 97 in the second Test match. He scored 210 runs with an average of 52.50.

In December 2019, Sri Lanka returned to Pakistan for a two-match Test series. This  marked the return of Test cricket in Pakistan after a decade's absence, with Rawalpindi Cricket Stadium hosting the first Test match. Babar, batting in his first ever Test inning on home soil, scored an unbeaten quick-fire century on day 5 of the rain-affected match, resulting in a draw. In the Second Test, played at National Stadium, he scored 60 and 100 not out respectively, ending the series with 262 runs with an average of exactly 262. Pakistan won the match by 263 runs, winning the series 1–0. In January 2020, he was named in 2019's ICC World ODI XI, making the list for the second time.

In January 2020, Bangladesh toured Pakistan for a three-match T20I series, with Azam captaining Pakistan for the first time at home. Pakistan won the T20I series 2–0, with the third match abandoned due to rain. It was Pakistan's first series win under his captaincy and his first Player of the series award as captain. In the first match of the Test series, he scored fluent 143 runs, beating his previous career best score of 127*. In May 2020, he was appointed as ODI captain as well. In June 2020, he was named as the T20I captain in a 29-man squad for Pakistan's tour to England during the COVID-19 pandemic to play three Tests and three T20Is. In July, he was shortlisted in Pakistan's 20-man squad for the Test matches against England. During the first day of the first Test, he scored an attacking unbeaten 69 runs in difficult conditions, to help his side get out of danger, his knock earned him appreciation from former England captains, Nasser Hussain and Michael Vaughan.

In the third and final Test of the series, he scored his 2,000th run in Test cricket, achieving the feat in his 29th Test. He finished the series with 195 runs at an average of 48.75 in five innings with two half-centuries.

In the second T20I against England, he became the joint-fastest batsman to score 1,500 runs in T20Is, reaching the milestone in 39 innings. He finished the series with 77 runs in two innings. Pakistan drew the series 1-1, after winning the third and final T20I, with the first match being washed out.

On 8 September 2020, he slipped to number two position in the T20I batsmen ranking after leading it for 22 months. He captained the team for the first time in ODIs in Pakistan's home series against Zimbabwe. Pakistan won the series 2–1. He scored 221 runs including a century score of 125 runs in the 3rd and final ODI and was named as Man of the series. In the first T20I of the series against Zimbabwe, he scored 82 runs, becoming the first batsman to score more than 1,000 runs in T20 cricket for the second consecutive year.

On 10 November 2020, Babar was appointed captain of Pakistan's Test side, ahead of their tour to New Zealand. He suffered a thumb injury while practicing and was ruled out of the Test series and later from the T20I series as well.

On 26 December 2022, Babar breaks the 16-year-old record of scoring the most runs in a calendar year by a Pakistan batter, going past Mohammad Yousuf. He achieved this feat while batting in the first Test of New Zealand tour of Pakistan at National Stadium, Karachi. He also achieved the feat of highest run scorer in Test cricket for the year 2022 in the same match, going past England's Joe Root.

No. 1 ODI batsman

In April 2021, while playing against South Africa in the first ODI, Babar scored his 13th ODI century in his 76th innings, making him the quickest to reach this mark, surpassing the record of Hashim Amla who took 83 innings to achieve the record. At the end of the series, he became the No. 1 ODI batsman, with 865 points, surpassing Virat Kohli who had previously been the top-rated ODI batsman for 1258 days.

On 14 April 2021, Babar scored his maiden T20I century (122), in a winning cause against South Africa in the Centurion Stadium. He and Mohammad Rizwan shared a partnership of 197 runs, which is the highest partnership for Pakistan in T20Is and the fourth-highest partnership of all time in the format. On 25 April 2021, in the third T20I against Zimbabwe, Babar became the fastest batsman, in terms of innings, to score 2,000 runs in T20Is, doing so in his 52nd innings. In September 2021, Babar was named as the captain of Pakistan's squad for the 2021 ICC Men's T20 World Cup. During the tournament he regained his position as the number one T20I batsman in the rankings. Babar break the record of most fifties (4) and runs (303) in a T20 World Cup edition. He led Pakistan to the semi-finals, where they lost to Australia, ending their campaign. In March 2022, Australia toured Pakistan after 24 years, in the second test match of the series, he scored 196 runs and broke the record of most runs by a captain in the fourth innings of a test. A week later, during the first ODI against Australia played at Gaddafi Stadium, he became the second fastest overall and fastest Asian to score 4,000 ODI runs, achieving the feat in his 82nd inning. Few days later, during the second ODI match, he became the first Pakistani skipper to score an ODI century against Australia, also becoming the fastest batsman overall in terms of innings (83) to score 15th ODI century, and helped Pakistan to register their highest successful run chase in ODIs. In the third and decider match of the series, he scored yet another hundred which helped Pakistan chase 211 runs comfortably and win the series 2–1. This was Pakistan's first ODI series win against Australia since 2002. He was named man of the match for second consecutive time in the series and also man of the series for his 276 runs with an average of 138.00.

Domestic and franchise cricket

Quaid-e-Azam Trophy and National T20 Cup

Babar initially played domestic cricket for the Zarai Taraqiati Bank Limited cricket team and for Islamabad Leopards as an emerging player. For next couple of years, he played first-class cricket for State Bank of Pakistan cricket team and Sui Southern Gas Company cricket team in the Quaid-e-Azam Trophy respectively.

In September 2019, Babar was named as the captain of the newly formed Central Punjab for the 2019–20 domestic season. His team went on to win the trophy after defeating Northern in the final. He led his side in the 2019–20 National T20 Cup. In the first match for his side, he scored a century, becoming the first Pakistani cricketer to score three centuries as well as more than 1,500 runs in Twenty20 cricket in a calendar year.

He was retained by Central Punjab for the 2020–21 domestic season, both as a player and captain of the team. On 12 October 2020, during the match against Balochistan, he became the fastest batsman in terms of innings (27) to score 1,000 runs in National T20 Cup's history. In October 2021, in the 2021–22 National T20 Cup, he became the fastest batsman, in terms of innings, to score 7,000 runs in T20 cricket (187).

Pakistan Super League
Babar represented Islamabad United in the inaugural season of the Pakistan Super League. Before the 2017 PSL players draft he moved to Karachi Kings. He performed well in the 2017 season, scoring 291 runs at a batting average of 32.33 runs per innings and finishing the tournament as the second leading runs-scorer behind his cousin Kamran Akmal. He was retained by the Kings for the 2018 season and was the third-highest run-scorer with five half-centuries. He was again retained ahead of the 2019 Pakistan Super League. Before the 2020 season, he was appointed as vice captain of the franchise. He was leading runs scorer in Pakistan Super League 2020. He scored 473 runs with an average of 59.12. He led his team to PSL final victory. He won man of the match award in Qualifier and Final. He was also Player of the tournament in 2020 season. In the 2021 season, he scored 554 runs with an average of 69.25, breaking his own record of most runs in a single PSL edition. However, this record was broken in the next season by Fakhar Zaman. In December 2021, he was named as the captain of the Karachi Kings following the players' draft for the 2022 Pakistan Super League. Prior to the 2023 Pakistan Super League, Babar was traded by Karachi to Peshawar Zalmi in exchange for Haider Ali and Shoaib Malik while Peshawar also received the first pick in the supplementary round. Babar was also announced as Peshawar's captain, replacing Wahab Riaz.

Other leagues
In 2016, he was signed by Bangladesh Premier League (BPL) franchise Rangpur Riders, (later renamed as Rangpur Rangers), however due to national duties, he could not participate. In 2017, Babar played for Guyana Amazon Warriors in the Caribbean Premier League and Sylhet Sixers in the BPL. In 2019, Somerset signed Babar for the 2019 t20 Blast county cricket competition. He was the competition's highest run-scorer with 578 runs in 13 matches including four half-centuries and one century and recorded a batting average of 52.54 runs per innings. In January 2019, it was announced that he would rejoin Somerset for 12 matches in the 2020 t20 Blast as well as for two first-class matches. In August 2020, Somerset confirmed his participation, and was available after fulfilling his national duties. On 16 September 2020, in the match against Glamorgan, he registered his career best score of 114 not out off 62 balls and also completed his 5,000 runs in T20s, becoming the third fastest in the world and fastest Asian in terms of innings to achieve the milestone. The century against Glamorgan was also the first hit by a batsman in a T20 game at Sophia Gardens. He ended the season with 218 runs in 7 matches with an average of 36.33, finishing as team's second highest runs-getter. However, Somerset did not qualify for the quarter-finals.

Records and achievements

He is the third-fastest Pakistani batsman to reach 1000 runs in ODI cricket (21 innings). He is also the joint fastest Pakistani batsman to reach 2000 runs in ODI cricket (45 innings), along with Zaheer Abbas. Babar Azam is also the fastest Asian batsman to reach 3000 runs in ODI cricket (68 innings). He also holds the record to score the most runs in the first 25 innings of his career (1306 runs). Babar Azam is the only cricketer to score 5 consecutive centuries in a single country (United Arab Emirates). Babar is the fastest batsman to score 7, 13, 14, 15, 16 and 17 ODI centuries. With 17 centuries in ODIs he has the second most centuries in the format for a Pakistani batter. He is the only batsman in history to score 3 consecutive centuries twice. He is the fastest captain to reach 1000 ODI runs in 13 innings. He has the highest number of runs with 303 runs in the 2021 T20 World Cup. He is also the fastest batsman, in terms of time taken, to reach 1000 runs in T20 Internationals (26 innings). Babar Azam has also scored the most runs for Pakistan in a single World Cup (474 runs in 2019 World Cup). He has been the top ODI scorer for Pakistan in 2016, 2017, 2019 and 2021. Babar Azam has also been the top Test scorer for Pakistan in 2018 and 2019. He has the highest Test score for a captain and for Pakistan in the fourth innings of a Test match. He is the first Pakistani captain to beat India in a World Cup match. Babar is also the first Pakistani to win the ICC ODI cricketer of the year. He has the highest individual score for a Pakistani captain in ODIs. He is the fastest batsman to reach 2000 and 2500 T20I runs. He is one of 3 Pakistani batsman to score a century in all formats and has the highest T20I score for Pakistan. In the PSL he is the highest run scorer in the 2020 and 2021 with 473 and 554 runs. He is the first Pakistani Capitan and fifth overall to complete 1000 runs across all formats. He was the first Pakistani and fourth captain to score a century in every format. The 425 balls he faced is the fourth most by a player in the fourth innings of a Test match. He also has the record for the second-most minutes batted in the fourth innings of a match. He has the joint most international centuries by a Pakistani capitan.

Awards

2017
 He was named in the ICC Men's ODI Team of the Year 2017
 PCB's ODI Cricketer of the Year: 2017

2018
 PCB's T20I Cricketer of the Year: 2017

2019
 He was named in the ICC Men's ODI Team of the Year 2019

2020
 2020 Pakistan Super League Player of the Tournament
 ARY News Person of the Year 2020

2021
 Named as ICC Men's ODI Cricketer of the Year 2021
 Named as captain of the ICC Men's T20I Team of the Year 2021
 Named as captain of the ICC Men's ODI Team of the Year 2021
 Named as captain of the 2021 ICC Men's T20 World Cup Team of the Tournament
 Winner of ICC Player of the Month for April 2021
 PCB's ODI Cricketer of the Year: 2021

2022
 Named as ICC Cricketer of the Year ( Sir Garfield Sobers Trophy): 2022
 Named as ICC Men's ODI Cricketer of the Year 2022
 Named as captain of the ICC Men's ODI Team of the Year 2022
 Named in the ICC Men's Test Team of the Year 2022
 Winner of ICC Player of the Month for March 2022

References

External links

 

1994 births
Living people
Punjabi people
Pakistani cricketers
Lahore cricketers
Cricketers from Lahore
Pakistan Test cricketers
Pakistan One Day International cricketers
Pakistan Twenty20 International cricketers
Cricketers at the 2019 Cricket World Cup
Zarai Taraqiati Bank Limited cricketers
Islamabad Leopards cricketers
Islamabad cricketers
Lahore Eagles cricketers
Islamabad United cricketers
Rangpur Riders cricketers
Karachi Kings cricketers
Guyana Amazon Warriors cricketers
Sylhet Strikers cricketers
Somerset cricketers
Central Punjab cricketers
International Cricket Council Cricketer of the Year